There have been several Aragonese–French wars in history:
Albigensian Crusade (1209–29)
War of the Sicilian Vespers (1282–1302)
Aragonese Crusade (1284–85)
War of the Castilian Succession (1475–79)
Four Years' War (1521–26)